Jaroslav Gabro (July 31, 1919 - March 28, 1980) was a bishop of the Catholic Church in the United States.  He served as the first eparch (bishop) of the Ukrainian Catholic Eparchy of Saint Nicholas of Chicago from 1961 to 1980.

Biography
Born in Chicago, Illinois Gabro was ordained a priest for the Apostolic Exarchate of United States of America on September 27, 1945. Pope John XXIII named him as the bishop of St. Nicholas of Chicago on July 14, 1961. He was ordained a bishop by Archbishop Ambrozij Andrew Senyshyn, O.S.B.M. of Philadelphia on October 26, 1961.  The principal co-consecrators were Bishop Isidore Borecky of Toronto and Bishop Joseph M. Schmondiuk of Stamford.  He attended all four sessions of the Second Vatican Council (1962-1965).  Gabro served the eparchy as its bishop until his death on March 28, 1980, at the age of 60.

References

1919 births
1980 deaths
Clergy from Chicago
Bishops of the Ukrainian Greek Catholic Church
American Eastern Catholic bishops
Participants in the Second Vatican Council
20th-century American clergy